Evig pint (English: Eternally Tormented) is the second studio album by Norwegian alternative rock group Kaizers Orchestra, recorded in November and December 2002 and released on 3 February 2003.

Background 
After the release of the best-selling Ompa til du dør, and the EPs Død manns tango and Mann mot mann, the band started writing new material. "Die Polizei" was played in late 2001, although part of the plot of the following album, Maestro, rather than Evig pint. In February 2002, the band debuted the song "Salt og pepper" and continued to play it throughout 2002. Some new compositions were mentioned in interviews, called "Brolins Box Arrangement" and "Tyster". However, these were never mentioned again or played live. Nothing new surfaced until the band played "Djevelens orkester" once in fall 2002. Shortly after, in November, the recording sessions for the new album started. The sessions ended in December. A minimal amount of news about the new album surfaced, on their site and in newspapers and magazines.

Nearing the end of 2002, Kaizers Orchestra spoke about the new album. It was to be called Evig pint, and was due for release on 3 February 2003. "Die Polizei" was ultimately cut, as the band decided that the true feel of the song could only be experienced live. Thus, it was kept as an exclusive live song, and was not released on any album until the band's live album Live at Vega in 2006. Despite their announcement of keeping the song exclusive to live shows, the song was recorded for the compilation album Våre demoner in 2009.

Album art 
The album art features the band's organist Helge Risa in his trademark gas mask before a dark brown background. The liner notes feature pictures from a concert the band held at Rockefeller in Oslo.

Promotion and release 
In early 2003, the band released "Di grind" as a free download, exclusively on their site. They premiered the song "Evig pint" at the Spellemannsprisen award show (Norwegian Grammy Award). The album was released on 3 February 2003. Like its predecessor, it received many positive reviews from the major newspapers in Norway; however, it did not receive as many full marks in its reviews as Ompa til du dør.

The album was later re-released in other countries, but unlike Ompa til du dør, without changes. It was also released as a digipak CD and LP. Lastly, it was re-released as a bundle together with the 2002 EP Mann mot mann. In 2004, the album, together with the band's earlier and later releases, was re-released throughout Europe, due to the band having signed a contract with Universal Germany.

Ultimately, the album did not sell as well as Ompa til du dør and disappeared from the charts in Norway considerably faster. However, Evig pint remains one of the albums with most consistency in its overall review score released in Norway to date.

Style and lyrical themes 
Evig pint has a generally darker atmosphere than its predecessor, both musically and lyrically. A majority of the songs are about torment of the soul, heaven, hell, death and loneliness.

The lyrics also relate to each other to a lesser extent than Ompa til du dør. The band has said that the songs are more individual than their older compositions.

Track listing 
Lyrics for all songs are in the Norwegian language. All songs written by Janove Ottesen, except where noted.

 "Di grind" (Your Gate) - 4:09
 "Hevnervals" (Avenger's Waltz) - 2:50
 "Evig pint" (Eternally Tormented) - 3:54
 "De involverte" (Those Involved) - 4:18
 "Djevelens orkester" (The Devil’s Orchestra) - 3:50
 "Container" (Dumpster) (Zahl) - 2:20
 "Naade" (Mercy) (Zahl) - 1:32
 "Min kvite russer" (My White Russian) - 4:34
 "Veterans klage" (Veteran's Lament) - 1:27
 "Til depotet" (To the Depot) - 2:43
 "Salt & pepper" (Salt and Pepper) - 4:43
 "Drøm hardt (Requiem part I)" (Dream Hard) (Zahl) - 8:25

References

Kaizers Orchestra albums
2003 albums